Paul Brownlie (born 30 August 1977) is a Scottish former professional footballer who played as a striker. Active between 1995 and 2008, Brownlie made over 200 appearances in the Scottish Football League system, scoring 29 goals.

Career
Born in Falkirk, Brownlie played for Clyde, Stranraer, Raith Rovers, Arbroath and East Stirlingshire.

Personal life
His father John was also a professional footballer.

References

1977 births
Living people
Scottish footballers
Clyde F.C. players
Stranraer F.C. players
Raith Rovers F.C. players
Arbroath F.C. players
East Stirlingshire F.C. players
Scottish Football League players
Association football forwards